The 1985 Philippine Basketball Association (PBA) PBA All-Filipino Conference was the second conference of the 1985 PBA season. It started on June 23 and ended on August 20, 1985. The tournament is an All-Filipino format, which doesn't require an import or a pure-foreign player for each team.

Format
The following format will be observed for the duration of the conference:
 Double-round robin eliminations; 10 games per team.
 The top four teams will qualify in a double round carry-over semifinals. 
 The top two teams in the semifinals advance to the best-of-five finals. The last two teams dispute the third-place trophy in a best-of-five series.

Elimination round

Semifinals

Second seed playoff

Third place playoffs

Finals

References

PBA Philippine Cup
All-Filipino Conference